Keith McLeod (born November 5, 1979) is an American former professional basketball player and current varsity boys basketball head coach at East Canton High School in Canton, Ohio. He has also played in the NBA for the Minnesota Timberwolves, Utah Jazz, Golden State Warriors and Indiana Pacers, in the CBA for the Yakima Sun Kings, in the USBL for the Saint Joseph Express, in the NBA D-League with the Albuquerque Thunderbirds, Canton Charge, and Erie BayHawks, and in the Italian top league for Mabo Prefabbricati Livorno, Lottomatica Virtus Roma and Montepaschi Siena.

College career
In 2001, he was named in the All-MAC second-team. McLeod was the 2002 MAC men's basketball player of the year, leading the Bowling Green to the MAC championship game and a berth in the NIT. At the time of his graduation he was the school's second all-time leading scorer with 1,895 points.

Professional career
He was not taken in the 2002 NBA Draft, but was selected in the 2002 USBL Draft by the Saint Joseph Express, and in the 2002 CBA Draft by the Yakima Sun Kings.

He was traded on July 13, 2006 to the Golden State Warriors along with Devin Brown and Andre Owens for Derek Fisher.

On January 17, 2007, McLeod was dealt to the Indiana Pacers along with teammates Mike Dunleavy, Ike Diogu and Troy Murphy for Stephen Jackson, Al Harrington, Sarunas Jasikevicius and Josh Powell.

On July 11, 2008, McLeod signed a one-year deal with the Dallas Mavericks. He was waived by the Mavericks on October 23, 2008, and later played for the Albuquerque Thunderbirds of the NBA D-League. On September 1, 2010, McLeod signed a 1-year deal with the Greek club Panionios B.C.

McLeod signed with the Canton Charge of the NBA D-League in 2011. He was later traded to the Erie BayHawks.

In October 2012, McLeod joined BC Kalev/Cramo of Estonia and poured in 25 points in his first game in the VTB League for the club, including a game winning basket at the buzzer.

On June 13, 2016, McLeod agreed to become an assistant to head coach Matt Hackenberg on the Canton Glenoak High School boys varsity basketball team. His primary focus will be on player development with the Golden Eagles.

Education
McLeod attended Canton McKinley High School and graduated with a BS in Computer Science from Bowling Green State University.

References

External links
 Keith McLeod stats from basketball-reference.com

1979 births
Living people
Albuquerque Thunderbirds players
American expatriate basketball people in Estonia
American expatriate basketball people in Greece
American expatriate basketball people in Italy
American expatriate basketball people in Sweden
American men's basketball players
Basket Livorno players
Basketball players from Canton, Ohio
BC Kalev/Cramo players
Bowling Green Falcons men's basketball players
Canton Charge players
Erie BayHawks (2008–2017) players
Golden State Warriors players
Indiana Pacers players
Korvpalli Meistriliiga players
Mens Sana Basket players
Minnesota Timberwolves players
Pallacanestro Virtus Roma players
Panionios B.C. players
Point guards
Undrafted National Basketball Association players
Utah Jazz players
Yakima Sun Kings players